NIPS Hotel Management College Management Institute founded by Mr. Vivek Pathak in the year 1993. It is the frontrunner in the field of hospitality education offering Diploma, Degree & Master in Hotel / Hospitality & Culinary courses.

This year International highly acclaimed Master Chef Judge Chef Kunal Kapur has joined NIPS to impart his expertise as Chef de Specialiste.

NIPS Hotel Management is an educational institute providing with degree in hotel and hospitality management. It was established in the year 1993, at EC Block, Salt-Lake, Kolkata. The first batch of students graduated in 1996.

It is affiliated to MAKAUT, (former WBUT) and AICTE.

It offers undergraduate, masters and diploma courses in hotel and hospitality management.

Notable alumni
Priyam Chatterjee

References

Hospitality schools in India
Universities and colleges in Kolkata
Educational institutions established in 1993
1993 establishments in West Bengal